Stewartfield may refer to:
Stewartfield (Mobile, Alabama)
Stewartfield, East Kilbride

See also
Stuartfield, Aberdeenshire, Scotland